Ministry of Construction is an abolished Polish government administration office serving the minister in charge of construction, spatial management and housing.

The Ministry was established by a decree of the Council of Ministers of 5 May 2006. It was abolished on 16 November 2007 and incorporated into the new Ministry of Infrastructure.

List of ministers

External links
 Official government website of Poland

References

 
 
Poland,2006
2006 establishments in Poland